Eucarpia or Eukarpia was a city in Phrygia and a bishopric in the late Roman province of Phrygia Salutaris, in Asia Minor.

Location 
Eukarpia, mentioned by Strabo (XII, 576) and several other geographers, was situated not far from the sources of the Maeander River, on a road from Dorylaeum to Eumeneia, between the Dorylaeum-Acmonia and Dorylaeum-Synnada roads, probably at the modern Emirhissar, in Afyonkarahisar Province.

It was situated in a very fertile district, to which it is said to have been indebted for its name. The vine especially grew there very luxuriously.

Imposing ruins, seen by Hamilton in 1837, have almost disappeared. Little is known about the history of the city. Under Roman dominion, Eucarpia belonged to the conventus of Synnada, to the southwest of which city it was situated. It struck its own coins from the time of Augustus until the reign of Volusianus.

Ecclesiastical history 

The bishopric, a suffragan of Synnada, figures in the Notitiae episcopatuum until the twelfth or thirteenth century. Six bishops are known:

Eugenius, present at the Council of Nicaea (325),
Auxomenus in 381, 
Cyriacus in 451, 
Dionysius in 536, 
Constantine or Constans in 787 (not mentioned by Le Quien), and Constantine in 879.

Eukarpia is included in the Catholic Church's list of titular sees.

References

Attribution

Catholic titular sees in Asia
Populated places in Phrygia
Former populated places in Turkey
Roman sites in Turkey
Roman towns and cities in Turkey
History of Afyonkarahisar Province
Populated places of the Byzantine Empire
Defunct dioceses of the Ecumenical Patriarchate of Constantinople
Sandıklı District